Melquisedec "Melky" Mesa (born January 31, 1987) is a Dominican professional baseball outfielder for the York Revolution of the Atlantic League of Professional Baseball. He has played in Major League Baseball (MLB) for the New York Yankees.

Career

New York Yankees
The Yankees signed Mesa as an international free agent in 2003.  He played in the Rookie-level Gulf Coast League (GCL) for the GCL Yankees in 2007, for the Staten Island Yankees of the Class A-Short Season New York–Penn League in 2008, and the Charleston RiverDogs of the Class A South Atlantic League (SAL) in 2009. He was named to the SAL All-Star Game, and participated in the league's Home Run Derby that year.

In 2010, Mesa played for the Tampa Yankees of the Class A-Advanced Florida State League and was named the league's Player of the Year. The Yankees added Mesa to their 40-man roster on November 2, 2010, to protect him from the Rule 5 draft.

The Yankees first promoted Mesa to the major leagues on September 10, 2012. Mesa made his major league debut on September 22, 2012, against the Oakland Athletics in the bottom of the 14th inning as a pinch runner with the score tied 9–9. Derek Jeter bunted him to second base, and one batter later, Alex Rodriguez hit a single up the middle which should have brought Mesa home, but Mesa stumbled as he rounded third base and missed the bag. This forced him to backtrack, preventing him from scoring the winning run in his first major league game. He recorded his first major league hit, an RBI single, on October 1 against Boston Red Sox pitcher Andrew Bailey.

Mesa was named the International League Player of the Week for the week ending August 11, 2013.

Mesa was released by the Yankees on September 1, 2013.

Kansas City Royals
Mesa signed a minor league deal with the Kansas City Royals on December 28, 2013, and played 23 games for the Triple-A Omaha Storm Chasers.

Toronto Blue Jays
On May 26, 2014, Mesa was traded to the Toronto Blue Jays along with P. J. Walters for cash considerations. Mesa was assigned to the Double-A New Hampshire Fisher Cats on May 27, then sent to the Triple-A Buffalo Bisons on June 12. He re-signed with the Blue Jays in January 2015. On January 12, 2015 he was assigned to the Double-A New Hampshire Fisher Cats. On April 30, 2015 he was promoted to the Triple-A Buffalo Bisons. On May 30, 2015 he was demoted back to New Hampshire. He elected free agency on November 7, 2015 and re-signed shortly afterwards. He became a free agent on November 7, 2016.

Saraperos de Saltillo
On July 7, 2017, Mesa signed with the Saraperos de Saltillo of the Mexican Baseball League. He was released on July 11.

York Revolution
On February 16, 2018, Mesa signed with the York Revolution of the Atlantic League of Professional Baseball. He re-signed with team for the 2019 season, and became a free agent following the season. On February 11, 2020, Mesa signed with the Revolution for the 2020 season. Mesa did not play in a game in 2020 due to the cancellation of the Atlantic League season because of the COVID-19 pandemic. On March 23, 2021, Mesa re-signed with the Revolution for the 2021 season. He became a free agent following the season. On February 15, 2022, Mesa again re-signed with York for the 2022 season.

References

External links

1987 births
Living people
Águilas de Mexicali players
Buffalo Bisons (minor league) players
Charleston RiverDogs players
Dominican Republic expatriate baseball players in Mexico
Dominican Republic expatriate baseball players in the United States
Gulf Coast Yankees players
Leones del Escogido players
Major League Baseball players from the Dominican Republic
Major League Baseball outfielders
Mexican League baseball center fielders
Mexican League baseball left fielders
New Hampshire Fisher Cats players
New York Yankees players
Omaha Storm Chasers players
People from Bajos de Haina
Staten Island Yankees players
Tampa Yankees players
Trenton Thunder players
Saraperos de Saltillo players
Scranton/Wilkes-Barre RailRiders players
Scranton/Wilkes-Barre Yankees players
York Revolution players